Party of Five is an American teen and family drama television series created for Freeform by Amy Lippman and Christopher Keyser, based on the 1994 Fox series of the same name. The series is produced by Sony Pictures Television, with Lippman, Keyser, and Rodrigo García serving as executive producers.

The series stars Brandon Larracuente, Emily Tosta, Niko Guardado, and Elle Paris Legaspi as four of the five Acosta children who must navigate daily struggles after their parents are deported to Mexico. By September 2017, Lippman and Keyser were developing a reboot of their television series Party of Five. The series received a put pilot commitment at Freeform in January 2018, with a pilot ordered in January 2018. Larracuente, Tosta, Guardado, and Legaspi were cast in October 2018, and the series was officially ordered by Freeform in February 2019.

Party of Five premiered on January 8, 2020, and its first season consists of 10 episodes. In April 2020, the series was canceled after one season.

Premise
The series follows the five Acosta children as they navigate daily struggles after their parents are deported back to Mexico. Until they find a way to get their parents back in the country, these five kids will have to find a way to make it on their own.

Cast and characters

Main

 Brandon Larracuente as Emilio Acosta, an aspiring musician and the eldest sibling of the family
 Niko Guardado as Beto Acosta, the second oldest brother of the family
 Emily Tosta as Lucia Acosta, a straight-A student and Beto's twin sibling
 Elle Paris Legaspi as Valentina Acosta, the precocious and resourceful youngest sister

Recurring

 Bruno Bichir as Javier Acosta, father of Emilio, Lucia, Beto, Valentina and Rafael
 Fernanda Urrejola as Gloria Acosta, mother of Emilio, Lucia, Beto, Valentina and Rafael
 Garcia as Matthew, an undocumented young trans man that Val and Lucia meet at church
 Sol Rodríguez as Natalia, the Acostas' new babysitter
 Elizabeth Grullon as Sully, a lesbian immigration activist and Lucia's mentor.
 Amanda Arcuri as Vanessa, a psychology graduate student and love interest for Emilio. She works at the restaurant as a hostess.
 Mann Alfonso as Oscar, a worker at the Acostas' restaurant
 Audrey Gerthoffer as Ella, Beto's love interest

Guest starring
 Jessica Lord as Alice, a young mother

Episodes

Production

Development
In September 2017, it was reported that Christopher Keyser and Amy Lippman were developing a reboot of their 1994 Fox series Party of Five for Sony Pictures Television. In January 2018, Freeform landed the reboot with a put pilot commitment, to be written by original series creators Keyser and Lippman, alongside Michal Zebede with Rodrigo García signed on to direct and executive produce the pilot. The series follows siblings who must take care of themselves after their parents are deported back to Mexico. Freeform officially ordered the series to pilot in September 2018, and the show was officially picked up to series on February 4, 2019. On April 17, 2020, Freeform canceled the series after one season.

Casting
In October 2018, Brandon Larracuente was cast as Emilio Buendía, Emily Tosta as Lucia Buendía, Niko Guardado as Beto Buendía, and Elle Paris Legaspi as Valentina Buendía The family name was later changed from Buendía to Acosta.

Filming
Filming took place in Santa Clarita, California. Production was briefly halted in October 2019 due to the California wildfires.

Release
The series premiered on January 8, 2020, and its first season consisted of 10 episodes.

Awards 
In 2020, Party of Five was awarded an Impact Award by the National Hispanic Media Coalition for "Outstanding Television Series".

Reception

Critical response
On Rotten Tomatoes, the series has an approval rating of 97% based on 30 reviews, with an average rating of 7.47/10. The website's critical consensus states, "With a strong cast and empathetic storytelling, Party of Five timely reinvention adds a new layer of urgency while still honoring the original series." On Metacritic, it has a weighted average score of 77 out of 100, based on 17 critics, indicating "generally favorable reviews".

Ratings
However, it was a modest performer with the audiences. The first season was one of the least watched shows on the Disney-owned networks that season. This, accompanied with a steady decline in viewership right through till the end led to the show being cancelled after only one season.

References

External links
 

2020 American television series debuts
2020 American television series endings
2020s American teen drama television series
2020s American LGBT-related drama television series
English-language television shows
Freeform (TV channel) original programming
Hispanic and Latino American television
Lesbian-related television shows
Serial drama television series
Television series about children
Television series about families
Television series about orphans
Television series about siblings
Television series about teenagers
Television series by Sony Pictures Television
Television series reboots
Television shows filmed in Santa Clarita, California